On the Threshold of a Dream is the fourth album by The Moody Blues, released in April 1969 on the Deram label.

Content 
The album begins with a poem accompanied by electronic sounds, and these sounds also appear at the close of the album Most European vinyl pressings of the album continue the sounds into the album's run-out groove, causing them to play continuously until the record player's tonearm is lifted. Tape and CD versions of the album employ a slow fade.

Release 

On the Threshold of a Dream was released on 25 April 1969 in the UK and 30 May 1969 in the US. On the Threshold of a Dream provided the Moody Blues with their first British number-one album, and also boosted their American fortunes by becoming their first top-20 album there. It proved to be one of the group's more enduring records in the US, staying in the Billboard LPs chart for more than two and a half years.

The album, along with the subsequent To Our Children's Children's Children, was among the tapes carried by Apollo 15 astronaut Al Worden to the moon.

In March 2006 the album was completely remastered into SACD format and repackaged with nine extra tracks. In 2008 a remaster for standard audio CD was issued with the same bonus tracks.

Track listing

Personnel

Justin Hayward – vocals, guitars, cello, Mellotron 
John Lodge – vocals, bass guitar, cello, double bass
Ray Thomas – vocals, harmonica, flute, tambourine, oboe, piccolo, EMS VCS 3
Graeme Edge – drums, percussion, vocals, EMS VCS 3
Mike Pinder – vocals, Mellotron, Hammond organ, piano, cello

Additional personnel

Tony Clarke - Producer
Pete Jackson – triangle
Phil Travers – cover artwork
Lionel Bart, David Symonds – sleeve note

Charts

Certifications

References

External links 

 

1969 albums
The Moody Blues albums
Deram Records albums
Albums produced by Tony Clarke (record producer)
Concept albums